SportsAid is a UK charity that helps British athletes, typically 12-18 whose parents are their only other means of support. The charity helps these athletes by giving them cash awards to help them meet the cost of training and competing.

Overview
In a typical year more than 1,500 sporting prospects receive SportsAid Awards of around £1,000 funded by the charity's partners, donors and supporters. These include Lloyds TSB, Asda, Eversheds, Hogarth, Founded and the Jaguar Academy of Sport. 

At the London 2012 Olympic and Paralympic Games two-thirds of the British athletes were SportsAid alumni, winning 20 Olympic and 27 Paralympic gold medals between them. Famous alumni include Sir Bradley Wiggins, Dame Sarah Storey, Sir Steve Redgrave, David Weir CBE, Sir Chris Hoy, Baroness Grey-Thompson and Sir Ben Ainslie.

London 2012 generated a lot of support for SportsAid's work and to maintain this in 2013 the charity launched a new campaign called "I Will". This campaign is led by a film directed by Morgan Hutchins and produced by Hogarth and Founded which is available on YouTube. Called "I Will Be Next", it features ten SportsAid athletes with big aspirations.

Once a year SportsAid holds its One-to-Watch Award at its annual SportsBall in London. Previous winners include Tom Daley, Team GB hockey player Harry Martin, sprinter Sally Brown and gymnast Courtney Tulloch.

SportsAid is registered in England and Wales as charity 1111612 and in Scotland as Scottish Sports Aid SC 000468.

Catherine, Duchess of Cambridge, has been patron of SportsAid since April 2013.

See also
 Talented Athlete Scholarship Scheme

References

External links
Official website

Funding bodies in the United Kingdom
Sports organisations of the United Kingdom
Youth sport in the United Kingdom